The Slovenia national rugby union team is governed by the Rugby zveza Slovenije, and has yet to qualify for the Rugby World Cup.

The national side is ranked 77th in the world, as of 16 January 2023.

Current players

Record
Below is a table of test matches played by Slovenia up to

Update : 13.11.2019

Results

Results of Slovenia's games at the 2018–19 Rugby Europe Conference 2 South

Guinness world record

Slovenia had the most siblings competing in a Rugby Union international when Archie, Jack, Frank, George and Max Skofic played for Slovenia against Bulgaria in the European Nations Cup Division Two match at Park Siska, Ljubljana, Slovenia on 12 April 2014.

Yet another record has been set in a test match against Austria when father and son played at the same time. Igor Okič (prop) joined Gal Okič (wing) from the bench as Slovenia scored a late game try to steal the game.

See also

 Rugby union in Slovenia

Links of Important Slovenian Clubs

 RAK Olimpija
 RK Ljubljana
 Rugby Maribor
 RUGBY SLOVENIA

References

RZS related links
 official website
 Slovenian "Get into rugby portal

European national rugby union teams
Rugby union in Slovenia
Teams in European Nations Cup (rugby union)
Rugby Union